The Brussels Times is an English-language Belgian news website and magazine, headquartered at Avenue Louise in Brussels. It was founded in 1965. 

It serves Belgium, particularly covering Brussels and many European countries. It originates from The Brussels Times newspaper, which was established back in 1965 and now has the largest readership of any English-language media in Belgium.

The media is owned by BXL Connect.

The digital site has a soft paywall and the print magazine is sold in shops and available for subscription.

History

The Brussels Times''' was founded in 1965 as a broadsheet newspaper.  In 2014, the media and brand was revived with a new design and strategy adapted for the digital age. 

AudienceThe Brussels Times covers general news, business, EU Affairs, op-eds, and other topic areas. It is today the largest English-language print & digital media in the Benelux. 

The readership consists of high income, high educated diplomats, politicians, business leaders, influencers, and professionals from a wide range of industries in Brussels, Belgium, and wider Europe.The Brussels Times is aimed at EU officials, researchers, development professionals and diplomats based in Belgium. It provides expats, foreigners and Belgians with Belgian news, EU affairs and opinion pieces. It has no political affiliation to any party and aims to present the news fairly and offer a wide range of analysis and opinion pieces, both local and global.

Magazine

The Brussels Times magazine is a bi-monthly print magazine, distributed free in the European Commission, European Parliament, over 150 embassies and many representations to the EU, as well as inside more than 10,000 hotel rooms in Belgium, many of which are in Brussels. It is also sold at most bookstores and newsagents.

The Brussels Times magazine focuses on stories about Brussels and Belgium, covering politics, art, history, food, sport, and other issues. It is currently edited by  Recent covers of the magazine have been illustrated by Ghent-based Belgian cartoonist Lectr.

Derek Blyth, author of 'The 500 Hidden Secrets of Brussels', is a regular contributor.

WebsiteThe Brussels Times online platform is the www.brusselstimes.com

Changes were made to The Brussels Times logo and website in May 2019.

 Brussels Behind The Scenes 

In November 2019, a new weekly analysis was launched online and sent to subscribers every week. "Brussels Behind The Scenes" brings the untold stories about the characters driving the policies which affect our lives. 

 Belgium in Brief 

"Belgium in Brief" is a free daily online roundup of the top news stories and was launched in March 2020. Subscribers can register for this information roundup online.

 EU Policy Rundown 

The EU Policy Rundown newsletter is sent to subscribers and provides weekly analysis and monitoring on policy changes. 

 The Recap 

At the end of March 2019, The Brussels Times was promoting a new daily newsletter "Want news from The Brussels Times in your inbox every morning? Sign up for The Recap, a free daily newsletter launching later this month 1 April containing all the stories you need to know from the day before. It goes great with your morning coffee".

Impact of Coronavirus

In April 2020, due to the outbreak of the coronavirus, the newspaper planned to ramp up efforts to provide timely and useful news about the evolving crisis and publicised for support on their website. 

Supporters would receive The Brussels Times Magazine delivered straight to homes. The magazine is a 148-page bi-monthly print issue covering a wide range of topics from Art & Culture, Philosophy, and History to Business and EU Affairs, giving insight into important local and global investigative topics. It also provides hidden secrets and tips in order to help rediscover unknown and forgotten places in Belgium.

Regular Contributors

Staff
 Jonadav Apelblat - Co-Editor in Chief
 Omry Apelblat - Co-Editor in Chief
 David Young - Sales Operations Manager
 Gidon Tannenbaum - Sales Operations Manager
 Orlando Whitehead - News Editor
 Ugo Realfonzo - News Editor
 Leo Cendrowicz - Print Editor
 Marija Hajster - Graphic Designer
  - Illustration
 Denis Maksimov - Art Director
 Mose Apelblat - Reporter
 Dylan Carter - Reporter 
 Maïthé Chini - Reporter
 Alan Hope - Reporter
 Liv Klingert - Reporter 
 Sam Morgan - Reporter
 Lukas Taylor - Reporter
 Lauren Walker - Reporter
 Caroline Dierckx - Sales 
 Thomas Moller-Nielsen - Reporter 
 Derek Blyth - Reporter

Regular Opinion Makers

On The Brussels Times'' website, they say they are always on the look-out for interesting opinions, op-eds and analysis articles on a wide range of topics.

They state if readers are interested in publishing one or several articles, they need to fill out the form online and include the first article. They will then review articles as soon as possible.

 David Abuchar Luna
 Connor Allen
 Oz Almog 
 Tamar Almog 
 Ramiro Austin
 Alexander Ayertey Odonkor
 George Bailey
 Yohan Benizri
 Pierre-Olivier Bergeron
 Roger Casale
 Ron Catz
 Mark Corner
 Rayyan Dabbous
 Nora Doorley
 Daniel Farrell-Flynn
 Asif Ullah Khan
 Joe Kirwin
 Dr Alexander Loengarov 
 Mathieu Maes
 Nicolas Moreau
 Rima Nieto
 Julius op de Bieke 
 Rory O’Regan
 Olivia Perce
 Eric Piaget
 Sam Rainsy
 Martin Schirdewan MEP
 Marius Tudor
 Pernille Weiss
 Olga Kikou

References

External links
 

1969 establishments in Belgium
News magazines published in Belgium
Bi-monthly magazines
English-language magazines
Magazines established in 1969
Magazines published in Brussels
Mass media in the European Union